The 1973–74 British Ice Hockey season featured the Northern League for teams from Scotland and the north of England and the Southern League for teams from the rest of England. 

Whitley Warriors won the Northern League and Streatham Redskins won the Southern League. Whitley Warriors won the Icy Smith Cup.

Northern League

Regular season

Southern League

Regular season

Spring Cup

Final
Dundee Rockets defeated the Fife Flyers

Icy Smith Cup

Final
Whitley Warriors defeated Streatham Redskins 18-5

References

British
1973 in English sport
1974 in English sport
1973 in Scottish sport
1974 in Scottish sport